Ships with the name Etne include:

 Norway (Known as MS Etne 1962–1983, now Gem Star)
 Norway (Known as MF Etne 1988–)

Ship names